Gopoupleu is a village in the far west of Ivory Coast. It is in the sub-prefecture of Kouan-Houlé, Danané Department, Tonkpi Region, Montagnes District.

Gopoupleu was a commune until March 2012, when it became one of 1126 communes nationwide that were abolished.

Notes

Former communes of Ivory Coast
Populated places in Montagnes District
Populated places in Tonkpi